The 2008 North Carolina gubernatorial election was held on November 4, 2008, coinciding with the presidential, U.S. Senate, U.S. House elections, Council of State and statewide judicial elections. Democrat Bev Perdue won the election. With a margin of 3.39%, this election was the closest race of the 2008 gubernatorial election cycle.

Because incumbent Governor Mike Easley was term-limited, the open-seat race was contested between Democrat Beverly Perdue, Republican Pat McCrory, and Libertarian Michael Munger. Likewise, Democrat Walter H. Dalton, Republican Robert Pittenger and Libertarian Phillip Rhodes vied to replace term-limited Lieutenant Governor Perdue.

Dates
May 6, 2008 – Primary elections.
Oct. 10, 2008 – Last day to register to vote in general election.
Oct. 16 – Nov. 1, 2008 – "One Stop" registration and early voting
November 4, 2008 – General election.

Primaries
Candidates Richard Moore, Dennis Nielsen, Robert Orr, and Bev Perdue took part in a forum on January 26, sponsored by the state chapter of the NAACP.

The statewide syndicated TV program, NC Spin, held debates for both parties' candidates in April.

Democratic

Candidates
 Richard H. Moore, State Treasurer
 Dennis Nielsen, Retired USAF Colonel
 Bev Perdue, Lieutenant Governor of North Carolina

Campaign
Moore and Nielsen appeared on the edition of NC Spin broadcast April 13 on most stations, but Perdue declined the invitation to participate. Perdue and Moore met for their final pre-primary debate at WRAL-TV, which was broadcast on several stations across the state on April 22.

On May 6, 2008, Perdue won the Democratic nomination for governor, defeating State Treasurer Moore and Nielsen.

Results

Republican

Candidates
 Bill Graham, Salisbury attorney and head of conservative group 
 Pat McCrory, Mayor of Charlotte (re-elected in 2007)
 Robert F. Orr, former state Supreme Court Associate Justice 
Elbie Powers, farmer, crop duster, vice president of NC Pecan Growers Association
 Fred Smith, North Carolina state senator

Campaign
The Raleigh News & Observer reported on January 9, 2008 that McCrory had filed the necessary paperwork with the State Board of Elections to run for governor. He announced that he was running in his hometown of Jamestown on January 15, 2008.

Debates
Republican candidates Graham, Orr, and Smith held their first debate on October 20, 2007 at High Point University. The two Democratic candidates held their first debate at the annual conference of the N.C. School Boards Association on Nov. 6, 2007, which hosted a Republican candidates' debate the same day.

UNC-TV invited the three announced Republican candidates and two announced Democratic candidates to participate in the campaign's first debates (officially called "forums") to air on statewide television. Each forum is intended to focus on a single topic: on Jan. 10, the state's economy; on Feb. 7, health care; and on April 24, education. Video of the forums is available on the UNC-TV website.

The Republican candidates, now joined by new challenger Pat McCrory, debated on WRAL-TV on January 17. The debate was also broadcast on stations in Charlotte and Wilmington.

McCrory, Orr, Graham, and Smith met in a televised debate held by WTVI in Charlotte on April 3. Media accounts said that McCrory was the primary target of attacks by his rivals. The same was true at another WRAL-TV debate, held on April 15.

The final Republican debate before the primary was held in Asheville, and featured the only appearance by Elbie Powers in a debate.

Results

General election

Candidates
Pat McCrory (Republican)
Michael Munger (Libertarian) 
Beverly Perdue (Democratic)

If he had been elected, McCrory would have been the first mayor of Charlotte to win the state's highest office.

Predictions

Polling
Despite a "national Democratic tide" and Perdue's fundraising edge, McCrory led Perdue at first; Perdue slowly gained with help from Barack Obama as the Democratic presidential candidate. Perdue and McCrory remained close, with the two often polling in a statistical tie in what was the closest race for governor in the nation. Perdue ran slightly behind her opponent in polls released the week before the election. Pundits speculated that Perdue was hurt by current Democratic Governor Mike Easley's decreasing popularity due to the aftermath of the 2008 Financial Crisis, and McCrory's efforts to tag her as part of corruption in Raleigh—consultants mentioned Perdue's "difficulty of being the candidate of continuity in a change election."

Campaign
Early in 2008, Libertarian nominee Munger called Perdue a "Stepford Wife" and said the Republican nominees were "circus clowns." Prior to May 2008, the North Carolina Libertarian Party and Munger gathered 100,000 signatures of voters in order to qualify to appear on North Carolina's ballot. They, along with the Green Party, sued the state unsuccessfully over the ballot access rules. Munger appeared as one of two keynote speakers at the national Libertarian convention in Denver in May 2008.

When Hillary Clinton dropped out of the 2008 presidential election The New York Times mentioned Perdue as a potential pick for Obama's Vice President.

Munger called himself "the only liberal in the race." Munger took more socially liberal positions on many issues than Democratic candidate Perdue.  "One reason I haven't been allowed in all the debates is that I'm taking votes from the Democrats. Sixty percent of my supporters are voting for Obama. I'll talk about gay marriage, and Perdue isn't, or doesn't want to."  While Democratic candidate Perdue took a hard line on illegal immigration similar to that of Republican Pat McCrory, Munger took a position more aligned with Barack Obama.

Perdue raised $15 million and ran attack ads against McCrory, criticizing him for not being tough enough on illegal immigration.

In October 2008, McCrory received the endorsement of most major newspapers in the state, which typically endorse Democrats. McCrory's candidacy for governor was endorsed by the Raleigh News and Observer, The Charlotte Observer, the Greensboro News & Record, the Winston-Salem Journal, and the UNC-Chapel Hill Daily Tar Heel.

Perdue received the endorsement of actor and director Andy Griffith, who filmed a campaign ad on her behalf.

Perdue defeated McCrory and Munger on November 4, 2008 to win the election.

Debates
The first general election debate between Perdue and McCrory was a forum at the North Carolina Bar Association meeting in Atlantic Beach on June 21. The first debate between the two that was televised live was conducted by WTVD on August 19. Another televised debate was held by WRAL-TV on September 9. Next, McCrory and Perdue met for a debate on education issues at SAS Institute on September 19. The debate was sponsored by business and education groups and was covered by News 14 Carolina.

Duke University professor and Libertarian candidate Michael Munger made history as the first third-party candidate to participate in a live, televised gubernatorial debate in North Carolina. He made his first debate appearance with McCrory on September 24 at UNC-TV. Perdue declined to participate in that debate.  All three candidates debated for the first time on October 15, in the final debate before the general election. The hour-long debate, sponsored by WTVI, WSOC-TV and the League of Women Voters, aired in several television markets.

Analysts said that McCrory tended to perform better than Perdue in the debates, particularly in "sit-down debates that allowed more back-and-forth between the candidates."

Results

See also
North Carolina gubernatorial election, 2004

References

External links
North Carolina State Board of Elections 
North Carolina Governor candidates at Project Vote Smart
North Carolina Governor race Lt. Governor from OurCampaigns.com
North Carolina Governor race from 2008 Race Tracker
Campaign contributions from Follow the Money
Collected polls from RealClearPolitics
McCrory (R) vs Perdue (D) graph of collected poll results from Pollster.com
Official campaign websites
Pat McCrory, Republican nominee
Michael Munger, Libertarian nominee
Bev Perdue, Democratic nominee
Primaries
OurCampaigns.com – Democratic Primary for Governor
OurCampaigns.com – Republican Primary for Governor

North Carolina
2008
Gubernatorial